Shark! Shark! is an Intellivision game originally designed by Don Daglow, and with additional design and programming by Ji-Wen Tsao, one of the first female game programmers in the history of video games. The player is a fish who must eat smaller fishes in order to gain points and extra lives while avoiding enemies such as larger fishes, sharks, jellyfish, lobsters and crabs.  After eating a certain number of fish, the player's fish grows in size and is thus able to eat a larger selection of fish.  However, while the larger fish becomes a bit faster, he is less agile than the small fish and has a harder time avoiding enemies.

Shark! Shark! was originally considered by Mattel to be a cute game for kids and unlikely to make strong inroads into the gaming community. The game was unexpectedly popular, forcing Mattel to quickly manufacture another batch of cartridges. The original cartridge run was only 5,600 units.

Legacy
 Shark! Shark! was made available for the PlayStation 3 through PlayStation Home in fall 2012 in a collection titled Intellivision Gen2. In addition to players being a fish eating other fish trying try to take down the shark, their food and foes will both swim in a wide variety of new patterns. It was also released on Microsoft's Game Room service for its Xbox 360 console and for Windows-based PCs in May 2010.
 An updated version of Shark! Shark! of the same name has been announced for release on the Intellivision Amico video game console. It is one of the six games that will be included with the console.

Bugs 
The bubble sound effects do not work correctly on the Intellivision II.

Occasionally, when pressing the sprint button, the player's fish will go in the opposite direction from that instructed—usually with disastrous results.

References

External links 
 Shark! Prototype for the Mattel Aquarius Computer

1982 video games
Action video games
Intellivision games
Intellivision-only games
Mattel video games
North America-exclusive video games
Video games developed in the United States
Video games with underwater settings